Shock waves is the first solo studio album by the American singer Leather Leone, better known for being the front woman of the American heavy metal band Chastain from 1984 to 1991. The album was released in 1989 through David T. Chastain's own label Leviathan Records.

Track listing
"All Your Neon" (Leather Leone, Pat O'Brien) – 4:24
"The Battlefield of Life" (David T. Chastain) - 5:39
"Shock Waves" (Mark Shelton) - 4:14
"In a Dream" (Chastain, Leone) - 5:22
"Something in This Life" (Leone, O'Brien) - 4:10
"Diamonds Are for Real" (Chastain) - 3:54
"It's Still in Your Eyes" (Chastain) - 3:58
"Catastrophic Heaven" (Chastain, Leone) - 3:42
"No Place Called Home" (Chastain, Leone) - 4:41

Personnel

Musicians
Leather Leone - vocals
Michael Harris - guitars
David Harbour - bass
John Luke Herbert - drums

Production
David T. Chastain - producer, keyboards
Steve Fontano - engineer, mixing
Dale "Smitty" Smith - engineer
Jamie King - mastering
Matthew H. Rudzinski - executive producer, project coordinator

References

1989 debut albums
Roadrunner Records albums